According to Jewish tradition the Men of the Great Assembly or Anshei Knesset HaGedolah ("The Men of the Great Assembly"), also known as the Great Synagogue, or Synod, was an assembly of 120 scribes, sages, and prophets, in the period from the end of the biblical prophets since the early Second Temple period (which started around 516 BCE) to the early Hellenistic period (which began with Alexander's conquests of 333–332 BCE). It comprised such prophets as Haggai, Zechariah, Malachi (who is identified with Ezra), Daniel, Hananiah, Mishael, Azariah, Nehemiah b. Hachaliah, Mordechai and Zerubbabel b. Shealtiel, among others. Roughly, this period corresponds with the Persian hegemony over the nation of Israel, as Simon the Just (c. 310–291) was one of the last remaining illustrious men of the Great Assembly.

Maimonides, in his introduction to his Mishneh Torah, designates the 'Great Assembly' as a rabbinic court established by Ezra the Scribe. Some modern scholars question whether the Great Assembly ever existed as an institution as such, and that it was rather to be understood as only a time reference, namely, the period of time between the return of the Jewish exiles under Persian rule and the beginning of Macedonian rule over Israel. Louis Jacobs, while not endorsing this view, remarks that "references in the [later] Rabbinic literature to the Men of the Great Synagogue can be taken to mean that ideas, rules, and prayers, seen to be pre-Rabbinic but post-biblical, were often fathered upon them".

Among the developments in Judaism that are attributed to the rabbis of this period are the fixing of the Jewish biblical canon, including the Book of Ezekiel, Daniel, Esther, and the Twelve Minor Prophets; the introduction of the Feast of Purim; and the institution of the prayer known as the Shemoneh 'Esreh, as well as other synagogue prayers, rituals, and benedictions.

When the rabbis of Kairouan sent a letter to Sherira Gaon in 987 CE, inquiring why there are no extensive records of the oral teachings of the men of the Great Assembly, but only the oral teachings bequeathed to Israel by Judah ha-Nasi in the Mishnah, yet without hardly any reference to their teachings, he answered them in his famous epistle, Iggeret of Rabbi Sherira Gaon, that their teachings were not disregarded, but rather their teachings were transmitted orally from generation to generation and incorporated in the teachings taught in the names of later scholars.

Membership

Role of prophets
The members of the Great Assembly are designated in the Mishnah as those who occupied a place in the chain of tradition between the Prophets and the tannaim:
 The Prophets transmitted the Torah to the men of the Great Assembly. … Simon the Just was one of those who survived the Great Assembly, and Antigonus of Sokho received the Torah from him.

The first part of this statement is paraphrased as follows in Avot of Rabbi Natan:
Haggai, Zechariah, and Malachi received from the Prophets; and the men of the Great Assembly received from Haggai, Zechariah, and Malachi.

In this paraphrase, the three post-exilic prophets are separated from the other prophets, for it was the task of the former to transmit the Law to the members of the Great Assembly. It must even be assumed that these three prophets were themselves included in those members, for it is evident from the statements referring to the institution of the prayers and benedictions that the Great Assembly included prophets.

However if the three post-exile prophets who were separated from the pre-exile prophets by many generations received from them through writings, then naturally this would assume that the later prophets of the Great Assembly who received from the previous prophets could have also done so through inheriting their writings, and this suggests that the transmission of the Law did not require their attendance at the Great Assembly.

Darius I was the obvious King at the time of Haggai and Zechariah as the statements made of "These seventy years" from Zechariah 1:12 refer to exactly seventy years from the 6th year of Darius I, when the 2nd Temple was completed, which when counted inclusively, from the destruction of Jerusalem in 587 B.C equals exactly seventy years.

Number of members
According to R. Johanan (3rd century), the Shemoneh Esreh (the Standing Prayer known as Amidah)) was established by the "men of the Great Assembly". Similarly, R. Jeremiah (fourth century), who attributes the establishment of Shemoneh Esreh to "120 elders, including about 80 prophets". These 120 elders are undoubtedly identical with the men of the Great Assembly. The number given of the prophets must, however, be corrected according to Megillah 17b, where the source of R. Jeremiah's statement is found: "R. Johanan said, and some say it was taught in a baraita, that 120 elders, including several prophets, instituted the Shemoneh Esreh." Hence the prophets were in a minority in the Great Assembly. According to the Babylonian Talmud, the date of Purim was fixed by the men of the Great Assembly, while the Jerusalem Talmud speaks of "85 elders, among them about 30 prophets" enacting the holiday. These divergent statements may be reconciled by reading in the one passage, "beside them" instead of "among them" in the Jerusalem Talmud; "30" instead of "80" prophets in R' Jeremiah's teaching.

The number 85 is taken from Nehemiah 10:2–29; but the origin of the entire number (120) is unknown. It was undoubtedly assumed that the company of those mentioned in Nehemiah 10 was increased to 120 by the prophets who took part in the sealing of the covenant, this view, which is confirmed by Nehemiah 7:7,14, being based on the hypothesis that other prophets besides Haggai, Zechariah, and Malachi were then preaching in Israel. These passages indicate that this assembly was believed to be the one described in Nehemiah 9–10, and other statements regarding it prove that the Amoraim accepted this identification as a matter of course.

As a single generation
According to Abba bar Kahana, "Two generations used the Tetragrammaton: the men of the Great Assembly and the generation of the shemad" (the persecution of Hadrian and the Bar Kochba revolt). This suggests that the Great Assembly lasted only for a single generation.

Many sources indicate that this generation was the generation of Ezra. Rabbi Joshua ben Levi even derived the term "Great Assembly" from Ezra's choice of words in Nehemiah 9:32, indicating that he viewed the Great Assembly as being present at the ceremony in Nehemiah 9. Other sources specify Nehemiah 9:5, 9:6, 9:7, and 9:18 as being spoken by the Great Assembly, while in the Bible these verses refer to a ceremony led by Ezra. Other sources assert that Ezra uttered the Tetragrammaton; paired with Abba bar Kahana's statement quoted above, this too suggests that Ezra was a member of the Great Assembly's generation.

Nehemiah, too, was considered to have been a member of the Great Assembly. Since Nehemiah himself was a member, Samuel b. Marta, a pupil of Rav, quoted a phrase used by Nehemiah in his prayer (1:7) as originating with his colleagues. Ezra was, of course, one of the members, and, according to Nehemiah 8, he was even regarded as the leader. In one of the two versions of the interpretation of Song of Songs 7:14, therefore, Ezra and his companions ("Ezra vahaburato") are mentioned, while the other version speaks merely of the "men of the Great Assembly" (compare the statements made above regarding the pronunciation of the Tetragrammaton). In the targum to Song of Songs 7:3, in addition to "Ezra the priest" the men mentioned in Ezra 2:2 as the leaders of the people returning from the Exile—Zerubbabel, Jeshua, Nehemiah, Mordecai, and Bilshan—are designated as "men of the Great Assembly." In the same targum (to 6:4), the leaders of the exiles are called the "sages of the Great Assembly."

An aggadic passage by Jose b. Hanina refers to the names of the returning exiles mentioned in Ezra 2:51 et seq., one version reading "the men of the Great Assembly" instead of "sons of the Exile," or "those that returned from the Exile" ("olei goleh"). This shows that the men of the Great Assembly included the first generation of the Second Temple. In Esther Rabbah 3:7, the congregation of the tribes mentioned in Judges 20:1 is apparently termed "men of the Great Assembly." However, this is due to a corruption of the text, for, according to Luria's skillful emendation, this phrase must be read with the preceding words "Ezra and the men of the Great Assembly"; so that the phrase corresponds to the "bene ha-golah" of Ezra 10:16.

It appears from all these passages in traditional literature that the idea of the Great Assembly was based on the narrative in Nehemiah 8–10, and that, furthermore, its members were regarded as the leaders of Israel who had returned from exile and laid the foundations of the new polity connected with the Second Temple. All these men were regarded in the tannaitic chronology as belonging to one generation; therefore Abba bar Kahana speaks of a single "generation of the men of the Great Assembly".

According to the rabbinic chronology, the period of Persian rule lasted just 34 years, at the beginning of the period of the Second Temple, confining the Great Assembly's activity to this generation. Modern chroniclers, however, put this period at c. 190 years, spanning several generations. As the last prophets were still active during this time, they also were included. 
Rabbinic chronology also held that prophecy ceased with the conquest of Alexander the Great.

In view of these facts, it was natural that the Great Assembly should be regarded as the connecting-link in the chain of tradition between the Prophets and the scholars. It may easily be seen, therefore, why Simeon the Just should be termed a survivor of this body, for, according to rabbinic tradition, it was this high priest (not his grandfather Jaddua) who met Alexander the Great, and received from him much honor.

It is thus evident that, according to the only authority extant in regard to the subject (the tradition of Tannaim and Amoraim), the Great Assembly's activity was confined to the period of the Persian rule, and that afterward, when Simon the Just was its only survivor, there was no other fixed institution which could be regarded as a precursor of the academies.

Though the Great Assembly was limited to a single generation (according to Seder Olam), some similar governing council may have existed in the centuries that followed it, using a different name. The term "Great Assembly" (knesset hagedolah) primarily referred to the assembly of Nehemiah 9–10, which convened principally for religious purposes—fasting, reading of the Torah, confession of sins, and prayer. Since every gathering for religious purposes was called "knesset", this term was applied also to the assembly in question; but as it was an assembly of special importance it was designated more specifically as the "Great Assembly". For similar reasons, another important religious gathering in this period was known as the kehillah gedolah ("great gathering").

Rulings
In addition to fixing the ritual observances for the first two quarters of the day, the Great Assembly engaged in legislative proceedings, making laws as summarized in the Book of Nehemiah. Tradition therefore ascribed to it the character of a chief magistracy, and its members, or rather its leaders, including the prophets of that time, were regarded as the authors of other obligatory rules. These leaders of post-exilic Israel in the Persian period were called the "men of the Great Assembly" because it was generally assumed that all those who then acted as leaders had been members of the memorable gathering held on the 24th of Tishri, 444 BC. Although the assembly itself convened only on a single day, its leaders were designated in tradition as regular members of the Great Assembly. This explains the fact that the references speak almost exclusively of "the men of the Great Assembly", the allusions to the "Great Assembly" itself being very rare, and sometimes based on error.

As certain institutions assumed to have been established in the early Second Temple period were ascribed to Ezra, so others of them were ascribed to the "men of the Great Assembly". There is, in fact, no difference between the two classes of institutions so far as origin is concerned. In some cases Ezra (the great scribe and the leader of the Great Assembly) is mentioned as the author, in others the entire Great Assembly mentioned; in all cases the Assembly with Ezra at its head must be thought of as the real authors. In traditional literature, however, a distinction was generally drawn between the institutions of Ezra and those of the men of the Great Assembly, so that they figured separately. But it is not surprising, after what has been said above, that in the Tanhuma the "Tikkunei Soferim" (called also "Tikkunei Ezra") should be ascribed to the men of the Great Assembly, since the author of the passage in question identified the Soferim (i.e., Ezra and his successors) with them.

The following rulings were ascribed to the men of the Great Assembly:
 They included the books of Ezekiel, Daniel, Esther, and the Twelve Minor Prophets in the Biblical canon; this is the only possible explanation of the baraita that they "wrote" those books. Ezekiel, Daniel and Esther—which were composed outside Israel—had to be accepted by the Great Assembly in order to merit inclusion. The grouping of the Minor Prophets was completed by the works of the three post-exilic prophets, who were themselves members of the Great Assembly. In this source, Ezra and Nehemiah (who were members of the Great Assembly) are mentioned as the last biblical writers (of the books named after them as well as Chronicles); while according to II Maccabees Nehemiah also collected a number of the books of the Bible.
 According to one opinion, they introduced the triple classification of the oral law into the branches of midrash, halakhot, and aggadot. This view is noteworthy as showing that the later representatives of tradition traced the origin of their science to the earliest authorities, the immediate successors of the Prophets. The men of the Great Assembly, therefore, not only completed the canon, but introduced the scientific treatment of tradition.
 They introduced the Feast of Purim and determined the days on which it should be celebrated.
 They instituted the Shemoneh Esreh, the blessings, and the various forms of kedushah and havdalah prayers. This tradition expresses the view that the synagogal prayers as well as the entire ritual were put into definite shape by the men of the Great Assembly.

Other activity
 According to Rav, the list of biblical personages who have no share in the World to Come was made by the men of the Great Assembly.
 An aggadic ruling on biblical stories beginning with the phrase "Va-yehi bayamim" (And it came to pass in those days) is designated by Johanan bar Nappaha, or his pupil Levi II, as a "tradition of the men of the Great Assembly". This is merely another way of saying, as is stated elsewhere in reference to the same ruling, that it had been brought as a tradition from the Babylonian exile. There are references also to other aggadic traditions of this kind.
 Joshua ben Levi ascribes in an original way to the men of the Great Assembly the merit of having provided for all time for the making of copies of the Bible, tefillin, and mezuzot, stating that they instituted twenty-four fasts to ensure that wealth would not be acquired by copyists, who would cease to copy if they became rich.
 The Mishnah ascribes the following teaching to the men of the Great Assembly: "Be patient in judgment; have many pupils; put a fence about the Torah." This aphorism, ascribed to an entire body of men, can only be interpreted as expressing their spirit and tendency, yet it must have been formulated by some individual, probably one of them. Like most of the first chapter of Avot, this passage is addressed to the teachers and spiritual leaders rather than to the people. These principles show commonalities with the spirit of Ezra's teaching on one hand, and with the later judicial philosophy of the Pharisees on the other hand.

An attempt has thus been made to assign correct positions to the texts in which the men of the Great Assembly are mentioned, and to present the views on which they are based, although no discussions can be broached regarding the views of the chroniclers and historians, or the different hypotheses and conclusions drawn from these texts concerning the history of the period of the Second Temple. For this a reference to the articles cited in the bibliography must suffice. Kuenen especially presents a good summary of the more recent theories, while L. Löw (who is not mentioned by Kuenen) expresses views totally divergent from those generally held with regard to the Great Assembly; this body he takes to be the assembly described in I Maccabees 14:25–26, which made Simeon the Hasmonean a hereditary prince (18th of Elul, 140 BC).

See also
 Council of Jamnia
 Knesset
 Sanhedrin

References

External links

Jewish Virtual Library: the Great Assembly (Anshe Knesset HaGedolah)

60s disestablishments in the Roman Empire
Establishments in the Achaemenid Empire
Jewish courts and civil law
Jewish scribes (soferim)
Rabbinical organizations
Return to Zion